Kafulafuta is a constituency of the National Assembly of Zambia. It covers the towns of Chondwe, Mubanga and Walamba in Masaiti District of Copperbelt Province.

List of MPs

References

Constituencies of the National Assembly of Zambia
Constituencies established in 1991
1991 establishments in Zambia